Midtown Centre is a business park located in the Jacksonville, Florida neighborhood of St. Nicholas. The site contains 31 buildings and was developed by Ira M. Koger. Opening in 1957 as the Koger Center, the facility is credited with being the first suburban office park. It is now (December 2012) owned by D Group Equities.

References

External links
Midtown Centre

Office buildings in Jacksonville, Florida
Business parks of the United States
Economy of Jacksonville, Florida
Buildings and structures in Jacksonville, Florida
Modernist architecture in Florida
Arlington, Jacksonville
Jacksonville Modern architecture
1957 establishments in Florida
Buildings and structures completed in 1957